Jhatgali is a small village in Ramban District of Jammu and Kashmir (Union territory), India. Where most of the people's are belongs to ManhasCommunity of Suryavanshi Rajputs. According to the historical "text". They came there in late of 17th Century .And start living there until now. There are various hamlets in this village such as Gagwan, Halla, Marot, Bataar etc.

References

Villages in Ramban district